Robert Jefferson (11 July 1881 – 1 January 1968) was a Canadian Anglican bishop in the mid-20th century.

Jefferson was educated at St John's College, Manitoba and ordained in 1908. He began his ordained ministry with curacies in Edmonton and Winnipeg. He held incumbencies in Montague and Ottawa. He was a Canon at Ottawa Cathedral from 1926 to 1939 when he became Bishop of Ottawa. He resigned his See in 1954.

References 

 

1881 births
University of Manitoba alumni
20th-century Anglican Church of Canada bishops
Anglican bishops of Ottawa
1968 deaths